Eugene Napoleon DeMontreville (March 10, 1873 – February 18, 1935) was an American professional baseball second baseman and shortstop. He played in Major League Baseball (MLB) for the Pittsburgh Pirates,
Washington Senators, Baltimore Orioles, Chicago Orphans, Brooklyn Superbas, Boston Beaneaters, Washington Senators, and St. Louis Browns between 1894 and 1904.

DeMontreville had a 36-game hitting streak from 1896 to 1897. When the streak was discovered in 1897, it was the tenth-longest hitting streak in MLB history.

Career
In 922 games over 11 seasons, DeMontreville posted a .303 batting average (1,096-for-3,615) with 537 runs, 17 home runs, 497 runs batted in (RBIs) and 228 stolen bases. He recorded a .921 fielding percentage playing at second and third base and shortstop. He was accomplished at the baserunning technique known as the delayed steal.

DeMontreville had a hitting streak over the last 17 games of 1896 and the first 19 games of 1897. This streak was not discovered until 2007, and at that time there were only nine longer hitting streaks in MLB history.

A heavy drinker, DeMontreville was prone to fighting and missing curfews. He did not remain on any major league team for more than three seasons. 

DeMontreville's younger brother Lee DeMontreville was also an MLB player, spending one season with the St. Louis Cardinals.

Later life
After leaving baseball, DeMontreville worked for the Mid-South Fair in Memphis, where he was the concessions manager. On February 18, 1935, a fire broke out in one of the concession stands. DeMontreville collapsed and died as he ran to investigate the fire.

See also
List of Major League Baseball career stolen bases leaders

References

External links

1873 births
1935 deaths
Major League Baseball second basemen
Major League Baseball shortstops
Baseball players from Minnesota
19th-century baseball players
Chicago Orphans players
Washington Senators (1891–1899) players
Washington Senators (1901–1960) players
Baltimore Orioles (NL) players
Brooklyn Superbas players
Boston Beaneaters players
St. Louis Browns players
Pittsburgh Pirates players
Montreal Royals players
Atlanta Crackers players
Toledo Mud Hens players
Birmingham Barons players
New Orleans Pelicans (baseball) players
Montreal Royals managers